Senan is a village and municipality in the comarca of Conca de Barberà in the province of Tarragona in Catalonia, Spain. Its population in 2011 was 55. It is part of the Garrigues geographic region, but in the 1936 comarcal revision was included in Conca de Barberà. The village has been mentioned in documents as early as 1139. Economic activity is agricultural, mainly non-irrigated barley, olives, almonds, and vines.

References

External links
 
 Government data pages 

Municipalities in Conca de Barberà